Maitland station is a train station in Maitland, Florida, served by SunRail, the commuter rail service of Central Florida. The station opened May 1, 2014, and marks the return of passenger rail service in Maitland since the days of the Atlantic Coast Line Railroad. It is the northernmost SunRail station in Orange County, Florida.

Maitland is typical of most SunRail stations featuring canopies consisting of white aluminum poles supporting sloped green roofs and includes ticket vending machines, ticket validators, emergency call boxes, drinking fountains, and separate platforms designed for passengers in wheelchairs. The station is located along the former CSX A-Line (originally constructed by the South Florida Railroad) along the west side of US 17/92 just south of the SR 414 interchange. A transit-oriented development called The Parker at Maitland Station is located adjacent to the station and features a five-story, 293-unit luxury apartment community.

Because the station currently averages the lowest ridership on the entire SunRail system with only 200 passengers a day, the City of Maitland constructed a pedestrian boardwalk that connects the station to the Greenwood Gardens neighborhood, which is located directly behind the station, in an effort to help boost ridership.  Additionally, the city plans for the construction of a parking garage to be built at the station. Despite the current low ridership numbers in and out of the station, city officials believe there will be a need for the garage in the future. Plans call for the garage to be built sometime during the 2019 fiscal year. The city is not looking to pay for the construction of the garage, but rather, fund it using federal or state grant money.

References

External links
Maitland Station (SunRail)

Railway stations in the United States opened in 2014
SunRail stations
Transportation buildings and structures in Orange County, Florida
2014 establishments in Florida